Maria Sharapova was the defending champion from 2004, but decided not to compete in 2005.

Nicole Vaidišová won the title.

Seeds

Draw

Finals

Top half

Bottom half

References

2005 Singles
Korea Open Singles
Korea Open Singles